Taravero is a hamlet and minor local entity in the municipality of Condado de Treviño, in Burgos province, Castile and León, Spain. As of 2020, it had a population of 13.

Geography 
Taravero is located 102km east-northeast of Burgos.

References

Populated places in the Province of Burgos